Padayatt Kesavapillai Vasudevan Nair (2 March 1926 – 12 July 2005), popularly known as PKV, was an Indian politician and lawyer who served as the 7th Chief Minister of Kerala from 1978 to 1979. He was a Member of the Lok Sabha from 1957 to 1971 and again from 2004 until his death in 2005. He became Chief Minister on 20 October 1978, following A. K. Antony's resignation as Chief Minister. However he resigned on 7 October 1979 owing to differences with other parties in the United Front. He served in the Kerala Legislative Assembly from 1977 to 1982. Nair was a senior member of the Communist Party of India

He was the founder-president of the Travancore Students Union, All India Students Federation (AISF) and All India Youth Federation (AIYF). He remained with the CPI after the split in the Communist movement in 1964 and was elected the party's State secretary in 1982.

Early life and education
He was born in Kidangoor village in Kottayam, Kerala to a Hindu Nair family of Kesava Pillai and Nanikutty Amma. He was their eldest child. He began his political life as a student activist while studying in Union Christian College, Aluva, when the whole country was in upheaval having entered the final phase of freedom struggle. After graduating in Physics he went on to study law at Government Law College, Thiruvananthapuram. PKV had his baptism in politics during his student days as an activist of the All India Students Federation (AISF).

Political career

Youth politics 
He joined the Communist Party of India in 1945 like many young radicals of his time who thought Congress were too moderate and pro-rich. The subsequent years saw him evolve as a student and youth leader. He was the president of Travancore Students' Union in 1947 and elected as President of All Kerala Students Federation in 1948.

Politics in Travancore-Cochin state 
PKV was first arrested for making a speech against the royal ruler of Travancore. He was among hundreds of communists who went underground when the Communist Party of India was banned following its adoption of the Calcutta Thesis that called for armed struggle against the ruling government in 1948. He took part in underground activities from 1948 to 1951 and was arrested in 1951 in connection with students' movement.

P K Vasudevan Nair and Balraj Sahani backed the idea of All India Youth Federation. Delhi's firebrand youth leader, Guru Radha Kishan was very active in organising the first national conference of AIYF in Delhi, this wholehearted effort was visible when more than 250 delegates and observers across India representing several youth organizations of various states attended this conference. PKV had acted as president of All India Students Federation, All India Youth Federation (AIYF) and Vice President of World Federation of Democratic Youth (WFDY).

Niyamasabha MLA and Lok Sabha MP 
He was elected to the Lok Sabha from Tiruvalla in 1957 from Ambalappuzha in 1962 and from Peermade in 1967. He was in the panel of chairmen and secretary of CPI Parliamentary Party in the Lok Sabha from 1967 to 1970. He was elected the MLA from Alappuzha in 1977 and 1980.

Chief Minister 
When the Communist Party split in 1964, he stayed with the CPI. After a long national parliamentary career, PKV returned to state politics in the 1970s and was elected to the Kerala Assembly in 1977 in the election held after the Emergency. He was the Industries Minister in the Karunakaran and A.K. Antony ministries from April 1977 to October 1978. When Antony resigned in 1979 protesting against the Congress' choice of Indira Gandhi as a candidate in Chikmagalur Lok Sabha by-election, PKV became Chief Minister with the support of the Congress on 29 October 1978 and occupied the post till 7 October 1979.

Personal life 

Whether in or out of power, he had always led a simple life and had been accessible to all sections of people. An ardent communist, the epitome of simplicity and a crusader for people's causes in his long political career spanning six decades that saw him elected to the post of Chief Minister, four-time MP and leader of CPI's Parliamentary Group in the Lok Sabha. He had left a vivid impression in the minds of the people.

From 1982 to 2004, PKV had stayed away from electoral politics, concentrating his time and energy on the organisational front. During this period, he mostly served as the state secretary of CPI.

PKV also served as editor of Janayugom daily, the organ of the Communist Party of India between 1954 and 1957.

Death 
P. K. Vasudevan Nair died at 3.35 PM on 12 July 2005 in AIIMS, New Delhi following multiple organ failure brought about by chronic heart ailment and severe diabetes. He was serving as the Lok Sabha MP from Thiruvananthapuram constituency, elected in 2004 elections. He was cremated at his daughter's house at Pulluvazhy near Perumbavoor. His wife, Lakshmikutty Amma, who was the younger sister of P. Govinda Pillai, a veteran Marxist scholar and PKV's classmate, died eight years later on 6 July 2013. The couple are survived by their three sons and two daughters.

References

Further reading
 

1926 births
2005 deaths
Communist Party of India politicians from Kerala
Chief Ministers of Kerala
Indian independence activists from Kerala
People from Kottayam district
Malayali politicians
Indian atheists
India MPs 1957–1962
India MPs 1962–1967
India MPs 1967–1970
India MPs 2004–2009
Lok Sabha members from Kerala
Leaders of the Opposition in Kerala
Chief ministers from Communist Party of India
Kerala MLAs 1977–1979
Kerala MLAs 1980–1982
Government Law College, Thiruvananthapuram alumni